United Nations Security Council resolution 489, adopted unanimously on 8 July 1981, after examining the application of the Republic of Vanuatu for membership in the United Nations, the Council recommended to the General Assembly that Vanuatu be admitted.

See also
 Member states of the United Nations
 List of United Nations Security Council Resolutions 401 to 500 (1976–1982)

References
Text of the Resolution at undocs.org

External links
 

 0489
1981 in Vanuatu
 0489
 0489
July 1981 events